Adulthood is the debut album by British singer CocknBullKid.  It was released in the United Kingdom on 20 May 2011 by Island Records.

Track listing

References

2011 debut albums
Island Records albums